Noah Korczowski (born 8 January 1994) is a German footballer who plays as a defender for Oberliga Niederrhein club TVD Velbert.

References

External links
 
 Noah Korczowski at Fupa

1994 births
People from Marl, North Rhine-Westphalia
Sportspeople from Münster (region)
Footballers from North Rhine-Westphalia
Living people
German footballers
Germany youth international footballers
Association football defenders
1. FC Nürnberg players
1. FC Nürnberg II players
VfL Wolfsburg II players
1. FSV Mainz 05 II players
SG Wattenscheid 09 players
Rot-Weiss Essen players
TuS Haltern players
Bundesliga players
3. Liga players
Regionalliga players
Oberliga (football) players